Karlova Studánka is a spa a municipality and village in Bruntál District in the Moravian-Silesian Region of the Czech Republic. It has about 200 inhabitants. The village is well preserved and is protected by law as a village monument zone.

Geography
It lies in the Hrubý Jeseník mountain range. The village is located in a valley of the Bílá Opava river, a tributary of the Opava.

History
The first written mention of Karlova Studánka is from 1554, under its original name Hinnewieder. The first spa buildings were built in 1782. The village was renamed Karlova Studánka (i.e. "Charles' Spring") in 1803 in honour of Archduke Charles, who defeated Napoleon in the Battle of Aspern-Essling.

Spa
The means of therapeutic stays are a climate with very clean air, natural carbon dioxide and mineral water, which is used for carbonic baths and peat wraps, inhalation and drinking. Today the spa is owned by the state. It specializes in the treatment of dusty lung diseases and non-tuberculous respiratory diseases.

Sights
The spa consists of valuable complex of timbered spa buildings and a spa park with a geological exposition of rocks and an artificial waterfall. The most notable building is the wooden Drinking Pavilion (Pitný pavilon) from 1895, where the Wilhelm spring is located.

References

External links

Karlova Studánka Spa

Villages in Bruntál District
Spa towns in the Czech Republic